Gajewniki-Kolonia is a village in the administrative district of Gmina Zduńska Wola, within Zduńska Wola County, Łódź Voivodeship, in central Poland. It is close to the village of Gajewniki. From 1975 to 1998, Gajewniki-Kolonia was a part of Sieradz Voivodship. The village has a population of approximately 160.

References

Gajewniki-Kolonia